FC Torpedo Pavlovo was a Russian football team from Pavlovo. It played professionally in 1961–1970 and 1992–2003. Their best result was 9th place in Zone 5 of the Soviet First League in 1961 (they also played on that level in 1962).

External links
  Team history at KLISF

Association football clubs established in 1961
Association football clubs disestablished in 2006
Defunct football clubs in Russia
Sport in Nizhny Novgorod Oblast
1961 establishments in Russia
2006 disestablishments in Russia